Kpété is a village in Rafaï Subprefecture, Mbomou prefecture, Central African Republic.

Climate
Kpété has a Tropical savanna climate (Aw) with dry, warm winters and wet, cooler summers.

References

Populated places in Mbomou